Rais Kola (also Romanized as Ra’īs Kolā and Ra’īs Kalā) is a village in Lavij Rural District, Chamestan District, Nur County, Mazandaran Province, Iran. At the 2006 census, its population was 539, in 120 families.

References 

Populated places in Nur County